Jeremy Jerod Ingram (born April 4, 1992) is an American professional basketball player. He played college basketball for the North Carolina Central Eagles after the 2013–14 season. Ingram was named MEAC Player of the Year in 2014. He was also a member of the Eagles team that made their first NCAA Division I appearance.

Following the close of his college career, Ingram signed his first professional contract with the Adanaspor Tigers of the Turkish Basketball Second League.

References

External links
North Carolina Central Eagles bio

1992 births
Living people
Adanaspor Basketbol players
American expatriate basketball people in Argentina
American expatriate basketball people in Turkey
American men's basketball players
Basketball players from Charlotte, North Carolina
North Carolina Central Eagles men's basketball players
Quimsa basketball players
Shooting guards